This is a bibliography of works by the English novelist and essayist Virginia Woolf.

Novels
The Voyage Out (1915)
Night and Day (1919)
Jacob's Room (1922)
Mrs Dalloway (1925)
To the Lighthouse (1927)
Orlando: A Biography (1928)
The Waves (1931)
The Years (1937)
Between the Acts (1941)

Short fiction

Short stories

"Phyllis and Rosamond"
"The Mysterious Case of Miss V."
"The Journal of Mistress Joan Martyn"
"A Dialogue upon Mount Pentelicus"
"Memoirs of a Novelist"
"The Mark on the Wall" (1917)
"Kew Gardens" (1919)
"The Evening Party"
"Solid Objects" (1920)
"Sympathy" (1921)
"An Unwritten Novel" (1920)
"A Haunted House" (1921)
"A Society" (1921)
"Monday or Tuesday" (1921)
"The String Quartet" (1921)
"Blue & Green" (1921)
"A Woman's College from Outside" (1926)
"In the Orchard" (1923)
"Mrs Dalloway in Bond Street" (1923)
"Nurse Lugton's Curtain"
"The Widow and the Parrot: A True Story" (1985)
"The New Dress" (1927)
"Happiness"

"Ancestors"
"The Introduction"
"Together and Apart"
"The Man who Loved his Kind"
"A Simple Melody"
"A Summing Up"
"Moments of Being: ‘Slater's Pins have no Points’" (1928)
"The Lady in the Looking-Glass" (1929)
"The Fascination of the Pool"
"Three Pictures"
"Scenes from the Life of a British Naval Officer"
"Miss Pryme"
"Ode Written Partly in Prose"
"Portraits"
"Uncle Vanya"
"The Duchess and the Jeweller" (1938)
"The Shooting Party" (1938)
"Lappin and Lappinova" (1939)
"The Searchlight"
"Gypsy, the Mongrel"
"The Legacy"
"The Symbol"
"The Watering Place"

Short fiction collections
Two Stories (1917)
Monday or Tuesday (1921)
A Haunted House and Other Short Stories (1944)
Mrs. Dalloway's Party (1973)
The Complete Shorter Fiction (1985)

Cross-genre
Flush: A Biography (1933)—Fictional "stream of consciousness" tale by Flush, a dog, but non-fiction in the sense of telling the story of the owner of the dog, Elizabeth Barrett Browning

Non-fiction

Biography
 Roger Fry: A Biography (1940)

Book length essays
A Room of One's Own (1929)
On Being Ill (1930)
 Three Guineas (1938)

Shorter essays

'The Common Reader'
'The Pastons and Chaucer'
'On not knowing Greek'
'The Elizabethan Lumber Room'
'Notes on an Elizabethan Play'
'Montaigne'
'The Duchess of Newcastle'
'Rambling round Evelyn'
'Defoe'
'Addison'
'Lives of the Obscure - Taylors and Edgeworths'
'Lives of the Obscure - Laetitia Pilkington'
'Jane Austen'
'Modern Fiction (essay)'
'Jayne Eyre' and 'Wuthering Heights'
'George Eliot'
'The Russian Point of View'
'Outlines - Miss Mitford'
'Outlines - Bentley'
'Outlines - Lady Dorothy Nevill'
'Outlines - Archbishop Thomson'
'The Patron and the Crocus'
'The Modern Essay'
'Joseph Conrad'
'How it strikes a Contemporary'
'The Strange Elizabethans'
'Donne After Three Centuries'
'"The Countess of Pembroke's Arcadia"'
'"Robinson Crusoe"'
'Dorothy Osborne's "Letters"'
'Swift's "Journal of Stella"'
'The "Sentimental Journey"'
'Lord Chesterfield's Letters to his Son'
'Two Parsons: James Woodforde, John Skinner'
'Dr. Burney's Evening Party'
'Jack Mytton'
'De Quincey's Autobiography'
'Four Figures: Cowper and Lady Austen, Beau Brummell, Mary Wollstonecraft, Dorothy Wordsworth'
'William Hazlitt'
'Geraldine and Jane'
'"Aurora Leigh"'
'The Niece of an Earl'
'George Gissing'
'The Novels of George Meredith'
'"I am Christina Rossetti"'
'The Novels of Thomas Hardy'
'How Should One Read a Book?'
'The Death Of The Moth'
'Evening Over Sussex: Reflections in a Motor Car'
'Three Pictures'

'Old Mrs. Grey'
'Street Haunting: A London Adventure'
'"Twelfth Night" at the Old Vic'
'Madame de Sévigné'
'The Humane Art'
'Two Antiquaries: Walpole and Cole'
'The Rev. William Cole: A Letter'
'The Historian and "The Gibbon"'
'Reflections at Sheffield Place'
'The Man at the Gate'
'Sara Coleridge'
'"Not One Of Us"'
'Henry James'
'1. Within the Rim'
'2. The Old Order'
'3. The Letters of Henry James'
'George Moore'
'The Novels of E. M. Forster'
'Middlebrow'
'The Art of Biography'
'Craftsmanship'
'A Letter to a Young Poet'
'Why?'
'Professions for Women'
'Thoughts on Peace in an Air Raid'
'Oliver Goldsmith'
'White's Selborne'
'Life Itself'
'Crabbe'
'Selina Trimmer'
'The Captain's Death Bed'
'Ruskin'
'The Novels Of Turgenev'
'Half Of Thomas Hardy'
'Leslie Stephen'
'Mr. Conrad: A Conversation'
'The Cosmos'
'Walter Raleigh'
"Mr. Bennett And Mrs. Brown" (1924)
'All About Books'
'Reviewing'
'Modern Letters'
'Reading'
'The Cinema'
"Walter Sickert: A Conversation".
'Flying Over London'
'The Sun And The Fish'
'Gas'
'Thunder At Wembley'
'Memories Of A Working Women's Guild'

Essay collections
Modern Fiction (1919)
The Common Reader (1925)
The London Scene (1931)
The Common Reader: Second Series (1932)
The Death of the Moth and Other Essays (1942)
The Moment and Other Essays (1947)
The Captain's Death Bed And Other Essays (1950)
 Granite and Rainbow (1958)
Collected Essays (four volumes, 1967)
Books and Portraits (1978)
Women And Writing (1979)

Drama
Freshwater: A Comedy edited by Lucio P. Ruotolo with drawings by Edward Gorey (first version 1923, revised and performed 1935, published 1976)

Translations

 Stavrogin's Confession & the Plan of the Life of a Great Sinner, from the notes of Fyodor Dostoevsky, translated in partnership with S. S. Koteliansky (1922)

Autobiographical writings
Moments of Being (1976) [2nd ed. 1985]
The Platform of Time: Memoirs of Family and Friends, edited by S. P. Rosenbaum (London, Hesperus, 2007)

Diaries and journals
A Writer’s Diary (1953) - Extracts  from the complete diary
A Moment's Liberty: the shorter diary (1990)
The Diary of Virginia Woolf (five volumes) - Diary of Virginia Woolf from 1915 to 1941
Passionate Apprentice: The Early Journals, 1897-1909 (1990)
Travels With Virginia Woolf (1993) - Greek travel diary of Virginia Woolf, edited by Jan Morris

Letters
Congenial Spirits: the selected letters (1993)
The Flight of the Mind: Letters of Virginia Woolf vol 1 1888 - 1912 (1975)
The Question of Things Happening: Letters of Virginia Woolf vol 2 1913 - 1922 (1976)
A Change of Perspective: Letters of Virginia Woolf vol 3 1923 - 1928 (1977)
A Reflection of the Other Person: Letters of Virginia Woolf vol 4 1929 - 1931 (1978)
The Sickle Side of the Moon: Letters of Virginia Woolf vol 5 1932 - 1935 (1979)
Leave the Letters Till We're Dead: Letters of Virginia Woolf vol 6 1936 - 1941 (1980)
Paper Darts: The Illustrated Letters of Virginia Woolf (1991)
Life as We Have Known It introductory letter (1931)

Prefaces and contributions
 Introduction to Selections Autobiographical and Imaginative from the Works of George Gissing ed. Alfred C. Gissing (London & New York, 1929)

References

External links 

 Review of Diary with excerpts

Bibliographies by writer
 
Bibliographies of British writers